McMuffin is a family of breakfast sandwiches sold by the international fast food restaurant chain McDonald's. The Egg McMuffin is the signature sandwich, which was invented in 1972 by Herb Peterson to resemble eggs benedict, a traditional American breakfast dish with English muffins, ham, eggs and hollandaise sauce.

Product description 
In the US and Canada the standard McMuffin consists of a slice of Canadian bacon, a griddle-fried egg, and a slice of American cheese on a toasted and buttered English muffin. The round shape of the egg is made by cooking it in a white plastic ring surrounded by an outer metal structure.

History 
The sandwich was invented in 1972. Former McDonald's President Ray Kroc wrote that Herb Peterson and his assistant, Donald Greadel, the operator of a McDonald’s Santa Barbara franchise in Goleta, California, asked Kroc to look at something, without giving details because it was:

One reason the sandwich was served open-faced was that a small tub of strawberry preserves was provided, along with a knife. The sweet and savory approach did not catch on (at least in the USA), although a packet of strawberry preserves will still be provided upon request.

The first McDonald's corporate-authorized Egg McMuffin was served at the Belleville, New Jersey, McDonald's in 1972.

See also 

 Croissan'wich
 List of sandwiches

References 

McDonald's foods
American sandwiches
Products introduced in 1972
Breakfast sandwiches